Madhesa is a former village development committee (VDC) in Sunsari District in the Kosi Zone of south-eastern Nepal. It merged with the district's headquarter Inaruwa. At the time of the 1991 Nepal census, it had a population of 4972 people living in 891 individual households.

References

Populated places in Sunsari District